Dorcadion phenax is a species of beetle in the family Cerambycidae. It was described by Jakovlev in 1899. It is known from Russia and Siberia.

See also 
 Dorcadion

References

phenax
Beetles described in 1899